The George Cross (GC) is the highest award bestowed by the British government for non-operational gallantry or gallantry not in the presence of an enemy. In the British honours system, the George Cross, since its introduction in 1940, has been equal in stature to the Victoria Cross, the highest military gallantry award. It is awarded "for acts of the greatest heroism or for most conspicuous courage in circumstance of extreme danger", not in the presence of the enemy, to members of the British armed forces and to British civilians. Posthumous awards have been allowed since it was instituted. It was previously awarded to residents of Commonwealth countries (and in one case to Malta, a colony that subsequently became a Commonwealth country), most of which have since established their own honours systems and no longer recommend British honours. It may be awarded to a person of any military rank in any service and to civilians including police, emergency services and merchant seamen. Many of the awards have been personally presented by the British monarch to recipients or, in the case of posthumous awards, to next of kin. The investitures are usually held at Buckingham Palace.

Creation
The George Cross was instituted on 24 September 1940 by King George VI. At this time, shortly after the climax of the Battle of Britain and during the third week of the Blitz, there was a strong desire to reward the many acts of civilian courage. The existing awards open to civilians were not judged suitable to meet the new situation, therefore it was decided to institute the George Cross and the George Medal to recognise civilian gallantry in the face of enemy action, and brave deeds more generally.

Announcing the new award, the King said:

The medal was designed by Percy Metcalfe. The Warrant for the GC (along with that of the George Medal), dated 24 September 1940, was published in The London Gazette on 31 January 1941.

The King in his speech announcing the new award, stated that it would rank next to the Victoria Cross. This was second on the Order of Wear, much higher than the then existing awards for bravery not in the presence of the enemy, the highest being the two-class Albert Medal (AM); and the lowest being the single class Empire Gallantry Medal (EGM). In a substitution of awards unprecedented in the history of British decorations, holders of the EGM were required to exchange their insignia for the GC, most receiving their replacement GC at a formal investiture. The four honorary EGM awards to foreigners were not exchanged and could therefore continue to be worn. In 1971, surviving recipients of the Albert Medal and the Edward Medal (EM) became George Cross recipients, but unlike the EGM exchange of insignia, they had the option of retaining their original insignia. Of the 69 holders of the Albert Medal and 70 holders of the Edward Medal eligible to exchange, 49 and 59 respectively took up the option.

Award
The GC, which may be awarded posthumously, is granted in recognition of:

The award is for civilians but also for military personnel whose actions would not normally be eligible to receive military awards, such as gallantry not in the face of the enemy. The Warrant states:

In June 1941 the specification of the ribbon width was amended to one and a half inches.

Bars can be awarded for further acts of bravery meriting the GC, although none have yet been awarded. In common with the Victoria Cross, in undress uniform or on occasions when the medal ribbon alone is worn, a miniature replica of the cross is affixed to the centre of the ribbon, a distinction peculiar to these two premier awards for bravery. In the event of a second award, a second replica would be worn on the ribbon.

Recipients are entitled to the postnominal letters GC.

All original individual GC awards are published in The London Gazette.

George Cross Committee
The George Cross Committee of the Cabinet Office considers cases of military and civilian gallantry. The committee has no formal terms of reference.

Recipients

Since its inception in 1940, the GC has been awarded 416 times: 401 to men, 12 to women, and three times collectively, to the Island of Malta, the Royal Ulster Constabulary (RUC) and the National Health Service. About half the recipients have been civilians. There have been 165 original awards including those to Malta, the RUC and the NHS, including 106 made before 1947. There have been 251 exchange awards, 112 to Empire Gallantry Medal recipients, 69 to Albert Medal recipients and 70 to Edward Medal recipients. Of the 162 individuals who received original awards, 86 have been posthumous. In addition, there were five posthumous recipients of the Empire Gallantry Medal whose awards in four cases were gazetted after the start of the Second World War and whose awards were also exchanged for the GC. All the other exchange recipients were living as of the date of the decisions for the exchanges.

Collective awards

The George Cross has been awarded to the island of Malta, the Royal Ulster Constabulary (RUC), and the National Health Service (NHS) of the United Kingdom.

Malta

The GC was awarded to the island of Malta in a letter dated 15 April 1942 from King George VI to the island's Governor Lieutenant-General Sir William Dobbie:

The Governor answered:

The cross and the messages are today in the War Museum in Fort Saint Elmo, Valletta. The fortitude of the population under sustained enemy air raids, and a naval blockade which almost saw them starved into submission, won widespread admiration in Britain and other Allied nations. Eric Grove argued on the BBC in 2017 that the George Cross was awarded as a propaganda gesture and consequently 'the island of Malta could not be allowed to fall as Singapore had done. Indeed, the North African campaign was being fought in 1942 as much to sustain Malta as vice versa.'

The George Cross was incorporated into the Flag of Malta in 1943 and, since independence in 1964, remains on the flag.

Royal Ulster Constabulary
The GC was awarded to the RUC in 1999 by Queen Elizabeth II following the advice of the first Blair ministry. The citation published by Buckingham Palace on 23 November 1999 stated:

The RUC was controversial before and during the Troubles; typically, Irish nationalists saw it as pro-unionist, while unionists had solidarity with the hundreds of RUC officers killed by republican paramilitaries. As part of the Northern Ireland peace process an Independent Commission on Policing for Northern Ireland produced the "Patten Report" in September 1999, which recommended structural changes and renaming the RUC the "Police Service of Northern Ireland" (PSNI).  The subsequent GC award was interpreted by some as a compensation or sop to unionists and RUC supporters for accepting the substantive changes; the UK government denied this. The Queen presented the George Cross on 12 April 2000 in a ceremony at Hillsborough Castle, County Down, attended by the senior RUC officers; the cross was accepted by PC Paul Slaine, who had lost both legs in a 1992 IRA attack.

The Police (Northern Ireland) Act 2000 gave effect to much of the Patten Report, with "the Police Service of Northern Ireland (incorporating the Royal Ulster Constabulary)" established on 4 November 2001. The pre-2001 RUC is often retrospectively referred to by sympathisers as "RUC GC"; the 2000 act established a registered charity "to be known as 'The Royal Ulster Constabulary GC Foundation' for the purpose of marking the sacrifices and honouring the achievements of the Royal Ulster Constabulary"; other instances include the names of the RUC GC Widows' Association, RUC GC Historical Society, and RUCGC–PSNI Benevolent Fund.

National Health Service

On 5 July 2021, on the 73rd anniversary of the founding of the NHS of the UK, Queen Elizabeth II announced in a personal handwritten message that the four NHS organisations of the United Kingdom would be awarded the George Cross. It was reported that the award was recommended by the Prime Minister, Boris Johnson. The conferral of the award followed an 18-month period in which the health service has been at the forefront of the fight against the coronavirus pandemic in the UK.

The message read:

It is with great pleasure, on behalf of a grateful nation, that I award the George Cross to the National Health Services of the United Kingdom. This award recognises all NHS staff, past and present, across all disciplines and all four nations. Over more than seven decades, and especially in recent times, you have supported the people of our country with courage, compassion and dedication, demonstrating the highest standards of public service. You have our enduring thanks and heartfelt appreciation. Elizabeth R.

Awards to the Commonwealth

Canada
There have been 10 GCs awarded to Canadians including those by substitution for awards superseded by the GC. The recipients comprised nine men and one woman. The GC is no longer awarded to Canadians by the King of Canada, who awards the Canadian Cross of Valour instead.

Australia

The George Cross was awarded to 23 Australians, 11 to the Australian forces and 12 to civilians. It is the highest decoration of the Australian honours system after the British Victoria Cross and the Victoria Cross for Australia. Although Australia established the Cross of Valour within the Australian honours system in 1975 'for acts of the most conspicuous courage in circumstances of extreme peril' it was not until 1992 that Australia officially ceased recommending British honours. During the period 1975 to 1992, the last George Cross to an Australian was awarded in 1978.

Of the 23 awards, 14 were direct awards and nine were Empire Gallantry Medal (two), Albert Medal (six) and Edward Medal (one) exchange awards. Four awards were to officers of the Royal Australian Naval Volunteer Reserve who served in the extremely dangerous role of mine disposal during the Second World War. Privates Benjamin Gower Hardy and Ralph Jones were posthumously awarded the George Cross for manning a Vickers machine gun during the Cowra breakout, a mass escape by Japanese prisoners of war in central New South Wales on 5 August 1944. Hardy and Jones disabled the weapon and denied its use to the escaping prisoners before they were overwhelmed and killed by the escapees. Courage of a different sort was displayed by two prisoners of war who endured terrible suffering. Captain Lionel Colin Matthews was eventually executed by his captors for building a resistance network in British North Borneo in the Second World War, while Private Horace William Madden, captured in Korea in 1951, died of privations while assisting fellow prisoners and openly resisting enemy efforts to force him to collaborate. The last Australian to be awarded the GC (in 1978) was Constable Michael Kenneth Pratt of the Victoria Police, Melbourne, for arresting two armed bank robbers in June 1976. For 39 years until the award to Dominic Troulon in 2017, Pratt was the most recent living civilian George Cross recipient. 

A memorial to Australian recipients, George Cross Park, was opened in Canberra, the Australian capital, on 4 April 2001 by the Governor General of Australia, Sir William Deane.

New Zealand
In 1999, the New Zealand Cross replaced the role of the George Cross. Up until then, the last George Cross awarded to a New Zealander, was posthumously awarded to Sgt Stewart Guthrie of the New Zealand Police for his actions and bravery during the Aramoana massacre.

Annuity
Holders of the Victoria Cross or the George Cross are entitled to an annuity, the amount of which is determined by the awarding government. , the annuity paid by the British government was £10,000. In Canada under the Gallantry Awards Order, members of the Canadian Forces, or people who joined the British forces before 31 March 1949 while domiciled in Canada or Newfoundland, receive $3,000 per year. Australia has been responsible for the payment of both the Victoria Cross Allowance and the George Cross annuity since the 1940s. The Victoria Cross Allowance which includes both the Victoria Cross for Australia and the British Victoria Cross is included in s.103 of the Veterans' Entitlement Act and is presently $A4,447 per year. Although there is not a statutory instrument for the payment of the George Cross annuity, both annuities for the Australian Cross of Valour and George Cross match the Victoria Cross Allowance payment.

Restriction of use
Since 1943, in accordance with the George Cross (Restriction of Use) Ordinance, it is unlawful in Malta to use the George Cross, an imitation of it or the words George Cross for the purposes of trade or business without the Prime Minister's authorisation.

See also
 British and Commonwealth orders and decorations
 :Category:Recipients of the George Cross
 List of George Cross recipients
 George Medal
 Cross of St. George, a Russian award
 St. George's cross, the flag of England
 Flag of Malta, a flag bearing the cross
 Soham rail disaster – 2 June 1944
 The Victoria Cross and George Cross Association
 Elizabeth Cross
 PDSA Gold Medal – seen as the animal equivalent of the GC

Notes

Bibliography

External links

 Official Victoria Cross & George Cross Association website
 Marion Hebblethwaits's listing and books on the George Cross
 New Zealand Defence Force – Medal information page
 Search recommendations for the George Cross on The UK National Archives' website.
 Canadian World War II recipients
 Ceremonial Secretariat – Types of Bravery Award
 Royal Engineers Museum: George Crosses awarded to Royal Engineers (Bomb Disposal)
 BBC On This Day 1942: Malta gets George Cross for bravery
 George Cross at Sea in World War 2, including Naval bomb Disposal
 Soham Rail Disaster 2 June 1944
 GC winners from The Times obituaries
 George Cross recipients from the county of Essex 
 "Stolen from Himachal, George Cross to go under hammer in UK". The Times of India. 26 November 2009.

 
Awards established in 1940
1940 establishments in the United Kingdom
Civil awards and decorations of Australia
Civil awards and decorations of the United Kingdom
Courage awards
Decorations of the Merchant Navy
National symbols of Malta
Saint George and the Dragon
George VI